The Macedonian Encyclopedia is the only known scientific encyclopedia of North Macedonia. It was published in 2009 by the Macedonian Academy of Sciences and Arts and edited by the Lexicographical Center, where 260 associates were involved in its preparation under the guidance of chief editor Blaže Ristovski.  With the financial support of the Government of the Republic of Macedonia, 2,000 copies were printed however, only 300 copies were sold or given away. The remaining 1,700 copies were withdrawn from the market because of the issuance of encyclopedia caused a storm of protest due to its content. Still, it can be downloaded for free.

The Macedonian Academy of Sciences and Arts had planned for an expanded edition covering areas not addressed in the two-volume set, which would then be translated into English.

Content 
The encyclopedia contains 9,000 entries representing the Macedonian point of view.

Promotion 
At the launch of the encyclopedia, Macedonian Academy of Sciences and Arts President Georgi Stardelov stated that, "This is the first Macedonian encyclopedia, free of foreign deposits and historical interpretations resulting from the principle of multiculturalism instead of ethnocentrism. It's not just an encyclopedia of the Macedonian people, but the Macedonian state."

Although the project may not display the whole life and development of Macedonia, this work authentically presents a view of Macedonian culture. This includes both its national present and political past, and it aspires to become an objective source of integral information about Macedonia and its people. Prime Minister Nikola Gruevski was convinced that objective approach and scientific argument would contribute an "authoritative presentation of Macedonia's centuries-old survival of this classic Balkan ethno-cultural space and truth to us in the past."

Reactions 

The issuance of the encyclopedia caused a storm of protest due to its content, and its authors have been subjected to severe criticism. Such reactions arose in the neighbouring  EU members Greece and Bulgaria, as well as in Kosovo and Albania. The reason behind the withdrawal was political pressure from US and UK diplomats.

United States Ambassador to Macedonia Philip Reeker said in an interview with Radio Free Europe, "It is important that Prime Minister Nikola Gruevski and DUI leader Ali Ahmeti together sat down to end the cycle of insults and threats that aim to break the positive direction in which Macedonia moves. For me most citizens of this country for a peaceful and prosperous future in Europe as part of the Euro-Atlantic family, as part of the European Union and NATO. And we cannot allow individuals who may have their agenda to distort this. I think that the leaders of this country demonstrate that."
The leaders of Albania and Kosovo also criticized the book.
Menduh Thaci, president of the Democratic Party of Albanians, announced the establishment of a parallel Academy of Albanians in Macedonia that would prepare an encyclopedia of Albanians in Macedonia. Furthermore, the party criticized ethnic Albanians in the Academy: Aljadin Abazi, Luan Starova, and Ali Aliu.
The ethnically Albanian New Democracy party asked Prime Minister Nikola Gruevski to refrain from printing the encyclopedia.
Limani Obadiah, a representative of the civil movement Wake Up said: "The first Macedonian encyclopedia threatens the constitutional multi-ethnic character of Macedonia, promotes inter-ethnic hatred, and falsifies the history of the Albanian people. It insults the feelings of every Albanian, as well as harms relations with American and British allies. We ask MANU to soon withdraw the scandalous encyclopedia, engage Albanian experts in the preparation of the history of Albanians in Macedonia, publicly apologized to the Albanian, American and the British people, and to condemn the views of Blaže Ristovski. Otherwise, we will consider these views are shared by the MANU. The same demand is made to the government, which is a supporter of this project."

Announcement of a new publication 
After the withdrawal of this edition of the Macedonian Encyclopedia, the MANU announced a new edition of the encyclopedia, with editor Mitko Madzunkov, who emphasized the need to make a new expanded edition adding that the old one is completed, but that it has many errors, not only material but also factual errors in terms of whole regions and peoples regarding Albanians in the Macedonian culture at large, recalling that he had received an order from Parliament to make second expanded edition. Thus, as he said in his interview for Nova Makedonija, the first issue is to toss or recycle and change more milestones.

References 

2009 non-fiction books
Historiography of North Macedonia
Macedonian encyclopedias
National encyclopedias